Toni is a 1928 British thriller film directed by Arthur Maude and starring Jack Buchanan, Dorothy Boyd and Forrester Harvey. It was made at Elstree Studios by British International Pictures and based on a play by Dion Titheradge.

Cast
 Jack Buchanan - Toni Marr / Marini 
 Dorothy Boyd - Princess Eugenie 
 Forrester Harvey - Watts 
 Hayford Hobbs - Delavine 
 Henry Vibart - Gardo 
 Moore Marriott - Meyer 
 Lawson Butt - Mendel 
 Frank Goldsmith - Olsen

References

Bibliography
 Low, Rachael. History of the British Film, 1918-1929. George Allen & Unwin, 1971.

External links

1928 films
Films shot at British International Pictures Studios
Films directed by Arthur Maude
British films based on plays
British thriller films
British silent feature films
British black-and-white films
1920s thriller films
1920s English-language films
1920s British films
Silent thriller films